Carl Buddy Baumann (August 4, 1900 – April 27, 1951) was an American football player in the National Football League. He played with the Racine Legion during the 1922 NFL season.

References

Sportspeople from Racine, Wisconsin
Players of American football from Wisconsin
Racine Legion players
1900 births
1951 deaths